Lepidochrysops kocak, the giant blue, is a butterfly in the family Lycaenidae. It is found in Kenya, Tanzania, Malawi, Zambia, Mozambique and eastern Zimbabwe. The habitat consists of Brachystegia woodland in hilly terrain.

Adults feed from flowers.

References

Butterflies described in 1997
Lepidochrysops